Diapolycopene oxygenase (crtP) is an enzyme with systematic name 4,4'-diapolycopene,AH2:oxygen oxidoreductase (4,4'-hydroxylating). This enzyme catalyses the following chemical reaction

 4,4'-diapolycopene + 4 AH2 + 4 O2  4,4'-diapolycopenedial + 4 A + 6 H2O

Diapolycopene oxygenase is involved in the biosynthesis of C30 carotenoids such as staphyloxanthin.

References

External links 
 

EC 1.14.99